In mathematics, an Abelian 2-group is a higher dimensional analogue of an Abelian group, in the sense of higher algebra, which were originally introduced by Alexander Grothendieck while studying abstract structures surrounding Abelian varieties and Picard groups. More concretely, they are given by groupoids  which have a bifunctor  which acts formally like the addition an Abelian group. Namely, the bifunctor  has a notion of commutativity, associativity, and an identity structure. Although this seems like a rather lofty and abstract structure, there are several (very concrete) examples of Abelian 2-groups. In fact, some of which provide prototypes for more complex examples of higher algebraic structures, such as Abelian n-groups.

Definition 
An Abelian 2-group is a groupoid  with a bifunctor  and natural transformationswhich satisfy a host of axioms ensuring these transformations behave similarly to commutativity and associativity  for an Abelian group. One of the motivating examples of such a category comes from the Picard category of line bundles on a scheme (see below).

Examples

Picard category 
For a scheme or variety , there is an Abelian 2-group  whose objects are line bundles  and morphisms are given by isomorphisms of line bundles. The additive structure  is given by the tensor product  on the line bundles. This makes is more clear why there should be natural transformations instead of equality of functors. For example, we only have an isomorphism of line bundlesbut not direct equality. This isomorphism is independent of the line bundles chosen and are functorial hence they give the natural transformationswitching the components. The associativity similarly follows from the associativity of tensor products of line bundles.

Two term chain complexes 
Another source for Picard categories is from two-term chain complexes of Abelian groupswhich have a canonical groupoid structure associated to them. We can write the set of objects as the abelian group  and the set of arrows as the set . Notice that if we repeat this construction for sheaves of abelian groups over a site  (or topological space), we get a sheaf of Abelian 2-groups. It could be conjectured if this can be used to construct all such categories, but this is not the case. In fact, this construction must be generalized to spectra to give a precise generalization pg 88.

Example of Abelian 2-group in algebraic geometry 
One example is the Cotangent complex for a local complete intersection scheme  which is given by the two-term complexfor an embedding . There is a direct categorical interpretation of this Abelian 2-group from deformation theory using the Exalcomm category.

Note that in addition to using a 2-term chain complex, would could instead consider a chain complex  and construct an Abelian n-group (or infinity-group).

Abelian 2-group of morphisms 
For a pair of Abelian 2-groups  there is an associated Abelian 2-group of morphismswhose objects are given by functors between these two categories, and the arrows are given by natural transformations. Moreover, the bifunctor   on  induces a bifunctor structure on this groupoid, giving it an Abelian 2-group structure.

Classifying abelian 2-groups 
On order to classify abelian 2-groups, strict picard categories using two-term chain complexes is not enough. One approach is in stable homotopy theory using spectra which only have two non-trivial homotopy groups. While studying an arbitrary Picard category, it becomes clear that there is additional data used to classify the structure of the category, it is given by the Postnikov invariant.

Postnikov invariant 

See also 

 ∞-groupoid
 N-group (category theory)
Gerbe

References 

 Thesis of Hoàng Xuân Sính (Gr Categories)

 
 - gives techniques for defining sheaf cohomology with coefficients in a crossed module, or a Picard category
 - exposition of stable 1-types containing relation with picard categories

Abelian group theory
Algebraic topology
Homological algebra